Arthur Pease may refer to:

 Arthur Pease (MP) (1837–1898), British coal owner and politician
 Sir Arthur Pease, 1st Baronet (1866–1927), his son, British coal owner and businessman